"Double Dutch Bus" is a funk song by Frankie Smith, made famous for its extensive use of the "izz" infix form of slang. Released in February 1981, the single capitalized on the jump rope game called Double Dutch, popular with American children since the early 1970s. The song became a foundation of hip hop music and dance.

Co-written by Bill Bloom of WMOT Records, "Double Dutch Bus" hit number 1 for four weeks on the Billboard magazine Best Selling Soul Singles chart.

Background
The song's rhythm and lyrics are based on the Double Dutch jump rope game. Such games were played by urban school children, and in 1973 they were formalized into a team sport in New York City. The song lyrics follow the pattern of older skipping-rope rhymes, and they mention the fast pass used by the Southeastern Pennsylvania Transportation Authority (SEPTA) bus system in Philadelphia. In 1980, the Double Dutch jump rope game was growing quickly in popularity, with the Fantastic Four competition team (four high school girls from New York) winning the Double Dutch World Championship and appearing in commercials for McDonald's.

Production and reception
Using the stage name Franklin Franklin, Frankie Smith wrote a song called "Double Dutch", published as a 7-inch single by Paramount Records in 1973, arranged by Caldwell McMillan Jr and produced by Schulman Music, but this single did not chart. After Smith saw that the jump rope game was again rising in the media, he and co-writer Bill Bloom persuaded contacts at WMOT Records to finance an updated version of the song, and it was recorded in 1980, engineered by Gene Leone at Alpha International, Philadelphia. The song rocketed to popularity in a matter of weeks and debuted on the US Billboard Hot Soul Singles chart in February, rising to the top spot by July, where it held at number one for four weeks. It also crossed over to the  Billboard Hot 100, where it peaked at number 30 in the summer of 1981.

The record became only the second in history (following the 1979 Barbra Streisand/Donna Summer duet "No More Tears (Enough Is Enough)") to receive two separate standard-release Gold certifications from the RIAA: first in June 1981 for sales of the 12-inch single; and a second Gold record in September 1981 for sales of the 7-inch radio edit.

In the National Geographic documentary "King of Coke: Living the High Life" Frankie Smith explains how the song was composed. He also states that WMOT Records failed to pay him his royalties, and how he therefore was unable to pay his taxes. An investigation was started which brought to light that WMOT Records was not only badly managed, but in fact laundering money for Larry Lavin, aka Dr. Snow, a dentist who was secretly dealing cocaine.

Chart positions

Sampling
The song was sampled by Missy Elliott for use in the song "Gossip Folks".

Raven-Symoné version

"Double Dutch Bus" was covered by Raven-Symoné in 2008. The track was released to promote the film College Road Trip and is the lead single from her fourth album, Raven-Symoné . The single was placed on Radio Disney on February 9, 2008, and became available for digital download through iTunes on March 4, 2008.

Music video 
The music video premiered on Disney Channel on February 18, 2008. The music video shows Raven and others dancing under a disco ball and enjoying a party bus. Images from the film College Road Trip are also seen. Cast member Donny Osmond makes a cameo appearance in the video, which was directed by Patrick Hoelck.

Track listing 
CD single/digital download
"Double Dutch Bus" - 3:02

Radio and release history

See also

List of number-one R&B singles of 1981 (U.S.)

References

External links
 Music video of Raven-Symoné version at YouTube

1981 singles
2008 singles
Raven-Symoné songs
Hollywood Records singles
1981 songs